Platypeltella is a genus of fungi in the family Microthyriaceae. The genus was circumscribed by Austrian-Czech mycologist Franz Petrak in 1929, with Platypeltella smilacis as the type and only species. Platypeltella remained monotypic until P. angustispora was added in 1969. A third species, P. irregularis, was described in 1982. All species grow as plant pathogens on monocot hosts.

References

Dothideomycetes genera
Microthyriales
Taxa described in 1929